Maula is a genus of antlions found in Africa, containing the single species, Maula stigmatus, described in 1912.
 This genus is classified in the tribe Palparini.

References

External links 

Monotypic Neuroptera genera
Insects of Africa